The following events occurred in June 1968:

June 1, 1968 (Saturday)
Austria became the first Western nation to agree to purchase natural gas from the Soviet Union, signing a long-term lease for an extension of a pipeline from Bratislava in Czechoslovakia.
Italy's government fell on the 22nd anniversary of the founding of the republic, as the Socialist Party decided not to form another coalition with the Christian Democrats.
The Sunday Times Golden Globe Race, promoted by London's Sunday Times as a round-the-world yacht race for a £5,000 prize, began with the departure from the Ireland island of Kilronan by John Ridgway on his sloop, English Rose IV. 
The Six Flags AstroWorld theme park opened in Houston, 8 months after its development was announced by Roy Hofheinz.  The park would last for 37 years, closing permanently on October 30, 2005, at the end of the season.
The flag of Alberta was officially adopted by the government of the Canadian province.
Born: Jason Donovan, Australian actor and singer, in Melbourne

Died: Helen Keller, 87, American author, political activist, and lecturer, and the first deaf-blind person to earn a bachelor of arts degree, died at her estate near Easton, Connecticut.

June 2, 1968 (Sunday)
A lack of seating at a theatrical performance in Yugoslavia triggered violent student protests in Belgrade.  A blackout struck the "Student City" (Studentski grad) dormitories on the day before final examinations were to start at the University of Belgrade, and students went across the street to the adult education center of Novi Beograd to watch a dress rehearsal of a variety show, "Caravan of Friendship".  Security guards at the center tried to turn the students away, a scuffle broke out and a 40-man unit of riot police was called to use a water cannon to send the demonstrators back to their dormitories.  By midnight, 3,000 students would begin a march toward government buildings in Belgrade and a riot began. Johnson's nomination of Fortas was not universally unpopular and was supported by influential senators Everett Dirksen (Republican), Richard Russell Jr (Democrat), Mike Mansfield (Democrat) and Ralph Yarborough (Democrat) as well as Attorney General Ramsey Clark.
The island of Iwo Jima and the Bonin Islands, also known as the Ogasawara Islands, were returned to Japan after 23 years of occupation by the United States Navy, and Japanese citizens were allowed to return.  At 12:15 p.m. local time, the American flag was lowered on Iwo Jima, where one of the bloodiest campaigns in World War II had been fought by the U.S. Marines against the Japanese Imperial Army, and the flag of Japan was raised in its place.  By agreement, however, the American flag remained at Mount Suribachi, where the first U.S. flag had been raised during the island's capture on February 23, 1945.
The U.S. Federal Communications Commission issued the landmark "Carterfone decision", allowing devices manufactured by companies other than the AT&T Corporation to connect directly to the AT&T telephone network without charge, as long as the devices did not cause harm to the network.  The Carterfone itself was a device that allowed users of a two-way radio system to talk directly to telephone users.  AT&T would respond in September by changing its network programming to allow connections only with recognized electronic signals that could only be produced by a "protective coupling arrangement" that would need to be leased from AT&T. 
The Wesleyan Methodist Church and the Pilgrim Holiness Church were formally merged to create a new denomination, The Wesleyan Church.
Born: 
Shannon Sharpe, American NFL football tight end, TV personality, and inductee into the Pro Football Hall of Fame; in Chicago
Paolo Maldini, Italian soccer football left-back for A.C. Milan for 25 seasons and 647 matches, and for the Italian national team for 126 matches; in Milan

June 27, 1968 (Thursday)
An essay that one historian would describe later as "the last straw for Prague's neighbors", "The Two Thousand Words Manifesto", was published in the new Czechoslovakian literary journal Literarni listy, 54 days before the invasion by the other nations of the Warsaw Pact. Ludvík Vaculík had written "Two Thousand Words that Belong to Workers, Farmer, Officials, Scientists, Artists and Everybody", and more than 60 other Czechoslovakian authors had signed the declaration.  The Politburo of the Communist Party of Czechoslovakia would decide against arresting Vaculik or the other signatories for their defiance, and the Soviet Union and the other Communist nations of Eastern Europe would conclude that "The Two Thousand Words" was the sign that the reforms of the "Prague Spring" had gotten out of control. 
Citing "an increase in the enemy's threat due to both a greater flow of replacements and a change in tactics," the U.S. Command in South Vietnam announced that it would pull its troops out of that nation's northernmost province, Quang Trị and closing the Khe Sanh Combat Base.  The United States Marines had sustained over 2,500 casualties during a 77-day siege of Khe Sanh by Viet Cong and North Vietnamese Army attackers.  The South Vietnamese Army, with the financial support of the United States, would take over the responsibility of defending Quang Tri, which would become the first province to be conquered during the invasion of 1975.  North Vietnam would cite the date of the announcement as a milestone in its history, noting that "On July 15, 1968, our soldiers were in complete control of Khe Sanh."
In London, American murder suspect James Earl Ray appeared for an extradition hearing at the Bow Street Magistrates' Court before Magistrate Frank Milton.  British barrister David Calcutt appeared upon behalf of the United States to request extradition so that Ray could be put on trial for the assassination of Martin Luther King Jr.  Roger Frisby, appointed to appear on Ray's behalf, argued that Dr. King had been  "a political figure" and that the extradition agreement between the UK and the U.S. did not apply to political crimes.  On questioning by Frisby, Ray said that he did not kill Dr. King.
Maccabi Tel Aviv F.C. defeated Bnei Yehuda Tel Aviv F.C., 2–1, to win the Israel Super Cup and the unofficial championship of Israeli soccer football.  Maccabi had finished first place in the Liga Leumit season, and Bnei Yehuda had won the Israel State Cup playoffs on June 12.
 U.S. and North Korean officials met at Panmunjom to discuss the terms for the release of the crew of the captured U.S. Navy vessel USS Pueblo (AGER-2).
Died: Colonel Renzo Rocca, 58, Italian official formerly with the Italian military intelligence agency SIFAR, by a gunshot wound to the head.  The death was ruled a suicide, despite speculation that Rocca was murdered.

June 28, 1968 (Friday)
The Uniform Monday Holiday Act was signed into the law by U.S. President Johnson, creating the pattern for most American national holidays to fall on Mondays and providing "3-day weekends" throughout the year. Washington's Birthday had always been on February 22, Memorial Day on May 30, Columbus Day on October 12 (in 34 of the 50 states) and Veterans Day on November 11.  Starting in 1971, Washington's Birthday would be on the third Monday in February; Memorial Day on the last Monday in May; Columbus Day on the second Monday in October in all states; and Veterans Day on the fourth Monday in October (although it would be restored permanently to November 11 in 1978.  The legislation had passed the U.S. House of Representatives on May 10 by a 218 to 83 vote, but sailed through the U.S. Senate on June 24 "by voice vote on a routine call of the calendar with only about eight senators present."
The Revenue and Expenditure Control Act of 1968 was signed into law, temporarily raising individual and corporate federal income taxes in the United States and cutting spending by $14 billion. Bill Moyers, an aide to President Johnson, would later say that the two and a half year delay in seeking a tax increase from Congress had been "the single most devastating decision in the Johnson administration" and the marking of "the beginning of the end, a time when he lost control of the administration and lost control of events.".
Johnson also sent proposed legislation for Congress to introduce a resolution that would amend the U.S. Constitution, allowing qualified U.S. citizens the right to vote at the age of 18.  "Reason does not permit us to ignore any longer the reality that 18-year-old young Americans are prepared," the President wrote in a message to Congress, "by education, by experience, by exposure to public affairs of their own land and all the world — to exercise the privilege to vote."  Although the bill failed, new legislation would be introduced in 1971 and the Twenty-sixth Amendment to the United States Constitution would be ratified within four months.
A passenger on board a chartered Douglas DC-3 airliner fell 8,000 feet to his death when the rear door opened and he was pulled out.  Jerrold Potter of Pontiac, Illinois, was one of 23 passengers who were en route to the annual Lions Clubs International convention in Dallas after boarding at Kankakee, Illinois on the DC-3, operated by the now defunct Purdue Airlines.  Potter had told friends that he was going to the lavatory at the back of the plane.  The pilot told reporters that Potter might have mistaken the airplane's rear exit for the door to the bathroom.  At the time, the plane's position was over Phelps County, Missouri, about 10 miles northwest of Rolla. Potter's body, which fell somewhere in the Ozark Mountains, would still be missing 50 years later.
Born: 
Adam Woodyatt, British actor who has portrayed Ian Beale in the BBC soap opera EastEnders for more than 30 years since the program debut in 1985; in Walthamstow, London
Chayanne (Elmer Figueroa Arce), American pop music singer and composer; in Rio Piedras, Puerto Rico

June 29, 1968 (Saturday)
Southeast Airlines Flight 101, a Douglas DC-3 flight from Marathon, Florida to Key West, was hijacked to Cuba shortly after takeoff, by one of its 15 passengers, an individual who had bought a ticket under the name "E. H. Carter".  Although there had been previous instances of airplane flights being forced to land in Havana, the Southeast hijacking would attract copycat crimes throughout the month of July and the rest of 1968 and 1969.  The pilot, a stewardess and the 14 remaining passengers were returned to the United States, but co-pilot George Prellezo, who had become a naturalized American citizen after fleeing the Castro government in 1960, was arrested and charged with desertion and for stealing a Cuban cargo plane to make his escape.  Prellezo would be released three weeks later.
The Indian state of Bihar was put under President's rule after none of the political parties were able to form a government.
The Viet Cong carried out the massacre of 88 civilians in Son Tra, a coastal fishing village outside where the houses had been built with money from the United States because of the residents' opposition to Communism.  Two months earlier, Viet Cong soldiers had come to Son Tra and made the threat that the village would be destroyed if the leaders continued to cooperate with the Americans.  Another 103 people were wounded, and 50 houses were burned. Troops who were assigned to protect Son Tra would say later that they were unaware of the raid until after it had ended.
The "Midsummer High Weekend" rock concert was held in Hyde Park, London; Pink Floyd, T-Rex, Jethro Tull and Roy Harper were among those appearing. It was the first large free concert ever held in the UK and attracted 650,000 people.
Born: Brian d'Arcy James, American stage actor, in Saginaw, Michigan
Died: Paddy Driscoll, 73, American professional football and baseball player, and inductee into the Pro Football Hall of Fame

June 30, 1968 (Sunday)
The Lockheed C-5 Galaxy heavy (248 tons when empty) military transport aircraft, described as "the biggest airplane in the world", made its very first flight.  Lockheed test pilot Leo J. Sullivan guided the plane's liftoff from Marietta, Georgia, where the GELAC (Lockheed-Georgia) aeronautical systems factory had constructed the aircraft.
In the second round of voting in France's parliamentary elections, for those seats where neither candidate had won a majority in the first round, Charles de Gaulle's party won a majority of the 487 seats in the Assemblée Nationale  The UDR (led by Prime Minister Georges Pompidou) and the de Gaulle supporting Républicains indépendants, which had already had 243 seats, picked up another 111 for almost 73% control.  The UDR alone had 293 of the 487 seats and had run on a campaign of "law and order"; the loss of seats by leftist Socialist and Communist parties was seen as a response by the voting public to the paralyzing strikes of the previous month.
A force of 18,500 Red Army troops and 650 tanks from the Soviet Union remained in Czechoslovakia, even though the Operation Šumava military exercise had been scheduled to end on June 30.  Soviet Army Marshal Ivan Yakubovsky declined to give an explanation to Czechoslovakian Defense Minister Martin Dzúr for prolonging the exercises, and when Prime Minister Alexander Dubček asked Marshal Yakubovsky about his intentions, the Soviet general said that he would "try" to finish the maneuvers by July 3, a deadline that would subsequently be ignored.  It would not be until July 11 that Marshal Yakubovsky would pledge to withdraw the remaining forces over a three-day period to end no later than July 16.  A withdrawal was finally completed by July 22, after several halts.
The Immigration and Nationality Act of 1965 went into effect as the quotas that had severely limited immigration to the United States from African and Asian nations were ended.
Born: Phil Anselmo, American heavy metal musician and lead vocalist for Pantera; in New Orleans

References

1968
1968-06
1968-06